The AN/FPQ-6 is a fixed, land-based C-band radar system used for long-range, small-target tracking. The AN/FPQ-6 Instrumentation Radar located at the NASA Kennedy Space Center was the principal C-Band tracking radar system for Apollo program.

RCA's Missile and Surface Radar Division developed the FPQ-6 skin tracking C-Band radar as a successor to the AN/FPS-16 radar set. The AN/FPQ-6 can provide continuous spherical coordinate information at ranges of 32,000 nautical miles (59,000 km ) with an accuracy of plus and minus 6 ft (1.8 m). The AN/FPS-16 has range limited to 500 nmi (930 km ) with an accuracy of 15 feet (5 m), although it could be modified to a maximum range of 5,000 nmi (9,300 km ).

Radar Ground Station Characteristics
------------------------------------

                           AN/FPS-16       AN/FPQ-6
                           ---------      ---------
Frequency band (MHz) ...   5400-5900      5400-5900
Peak power (MW) .........     1.3            3.0
Antenna size (m) ........     3.9            9.2
Antenna gain (dB) .......    47             52
Receiver noise figure (dB)    6.5            8
Angle precision (units) ...   0.15           0.1
Range precision (m)......     4.5            3.0

The AN/FPQ-6 radar employed a 2.8 megawatt peak power (4.8 kilowatt average), broad banded (5400–5900 MHz) transmitter with a frequency stability of 1×108.

The 8.8 m diameter parabolic antenna, using a Cassegrain antenna feed, had a 0.4° beamwidth and a gain of 51 dB. Its monopulse, 5 horn feed system permitted the reference and error antenna patterns to have their gains independently established as well as the slope of the error patterns optimized while supplying target return signals to the receiving system with a minimum of insertion loss.

The three channel signal outputs of the antenna feed system were supplied directly to the receiving system without undergoing any additional loss-inducing signal manipulation with bandwidths optimized for the specified pulse widths of 0.5, 0.75, 1.0 and 2.4 microseconds and the receiver noise figure of 7.5 dB was improved to 3.5 dB through the addition of closed-cycle parametric RF amplifiers. This system ensured a dynamic range in excess of 120 dB.

The receiving system provided simultaneous presentation of the skin and beacon returns to the console operator so that skin tracking could be used if the beacon signal was lost.

The antenna pedestal was a high precision, two axis mount, using a hydrostatic bearing in azimuth and phase roller bearings in elevation to provide mobility and support to the counterbalanced, solid surface antenna. The antenna was positioned through anti-backlash dual drive pedestal gearing via a high torque-to-inertia electro-hydraulic valve motor system. A viscous coupler located between the valve motor and pedestal drive gearing damped out undesired mechanical resonances.

The AN/FPQ-6 had a self-contained digital computer, an RCA FC-4101, whose primary purpose was to correct dynamic lag in the angular output data. As designed, both the AN/FPQ-6 and AN/TPQ-18 radars were provided with a built-in data processor referred to as the RCA 4101 Computer.

The ground floor of the two story building contained the air-conditioning, transmitter heat exchanger controls, equipment load center data input junction box and ex-Mercury atomic time standard. The first floor contained the 8 equipment racks, the console, and the 3 megawatt transmitter.

Functional description
The AN/FPQ-6 Missile Range Instrumentation Set is a fixed station long-range precision tracking set to be used for tracking intercontinental ballistic missiles for range safety and range user's trajectory measurement data.

The specifications for the FPQ-6 radar installation at Patrick Air Force Base, Florida, are shown in the following table.

Apollo Land-Based C-Band Radar Characteristics

Station    Station        Radar     Antenna      Peak    Receiver   Receiver    Unambiguous
           Location       Type     Diam.  Gain   Power    Noise    Bandwidth      Range
                                   (ft)   (dB)  (MW)  Figure     (MHz)      capability
                                                          (dB)                  (nmi)
-------------------------------------------------------------------------------------------
PAFB    Patrick Air       FPQ-6     29     51      3        4          1.6       32,000
        Force Base, FL

NOTE:
The nominal frequency range is 5.4 to 5.9 GHz.
Receiver bandwidth is for 1 microsecond pulsewidth.
FPS-6 radars have circular polarization capability.

Coherent Signal Processor
At least two of the AN/FPQ-6 systems were given the "CSP" (Coherent Signal Processor) modification. This added a synthesized transmit signal frequency and Local Oscillator frequency exciter, a TWT and Crossed Field Amplifier transmitter, an I&Q Pulse Doppler receiver with very narrow IF crystal filters, a Doppler Velocity tracking servo loop that digitally tuned the LO synthesizer, a real-time digital computer program to resolve pulsed-doppler frequency/velocity ambiguity (compared to noisy Range-Rate data), a hardwired logic Doppler acquisition processor that generated time compressed ambiguous velocity and acceleration profiles for correlation against stored, time compressed, replayed I&Q received samples to detect the best match to initiate ambiguous track (until ambiguity resolution corrected the track).

Some notes on the AN-FPQ 6 Radar 

The AN-FPQ 6 radar was built by RCA and was, effectively, a development of the AN-FPS 16. The Q6, as it was known by those who worked on it, was an amplitude comparison monopulse C-band radar, with a 2.8 MW peak klystron transmitter tunable from 5.4 to 5.8 GHz, which had a 9-meter parabolic antenna, having 52 dB gain, a 0.6 degree beam width, utilizing a Cassegrainian feed with  a five horn monopulse comparator.

A major features of the radar was its maximum unambiguous range of  despite a pulse repetition frequency [PRF]of some hundreds of pulses per second. (160, 320, 640, sometimes 80 & 1280)

To combine these two features requires that the radar carry out nth time around tracking, that is, it had to be able to track an echo resulting from a transmitted pulse other than that sent as the start of  the  same PRF period in which the echo was received.

In order to do so the range system  employed a 2-second time base which allowed the system to determine the number of PRF periods elapsing before an echo, resulting from a particular transmit (Tx) pulse was received. The range system  carried out a find process, then  a verify process before entering the auto-tracking mode. 

[Note: All the following discussion uses ranges in yards—the radar was designed to work in those units and converting them to metric units would not add any clarity to this description.]

The FIND process is first carried out. 
In this process two successive Tx trigger pulses are delayed by a time equivalent to an RF wave go and return distance of  Then the range gate triggers are delayed by an equivalent time. The delayed Tx trigger pulses are counted in an auxiliary counter, the zone counter, until target video pulses are detected in the delayed range gates. At this point the zone counter contains the number of PRF periods corresponding to the nth time around.

The VERIFY process is then entered. In this mode one Tx pulse is delayed for a  equivalent distance. The range gate in the  zone determined in the FIND mode is also delayed to match the TX delay. This sequence is repeated until four video returns, from eight attempts, are received. When the four returns are detected automatic tracking is maintained. 

The contents of the zone counter are added to the apparent range, that is the range reported in the current PRF period, to determine the actual range of the target.

If, during the Verify process four returns are not found after eight tries the Find process is re-initiated.

At the radar console the operator initiates the FIND mode, and the system carries out that  process by delaying triggers, and counting zones,  as described above, and finds that the zone counter has stored a count of four. The VERIFY mode then takes place, resulting in confirmation of the zone count.

As the radar was designed to track moving objects the need arose to handle targets which, in closing or opening range, during nth time around tracking, came into coincidence with the next Tx pulse.

So, in the jargon, the radar had to be capable of tracking “through the Big Bang.” (aka the Main Bang)  This arises from the fact that the antenna serves both the Tx and Rx. To allow this to happen a device called the Transmit-Receive Switch [T-R Switch]is used. The antenna is connected to the Rx until the Tx is 
pulsed. The T-R Switch detects the Tx pulse and transfers the antenna to the Tx for the duration of the pulse, say, 1 microsecond. [That period is that in which a radio wave would travel . The period is radar range, the round trip distance to and from the target.]

At the instant the Rx is disconnected from the antenna the range system will lose track.
In order for an Nth time around tracking system to work there has to be some arrangement to cover the loss of Rx signal for the Tx pulse period.
In the radar under discussion this is achieved as follows. When the target pulse reaches an apparent range of ± of the Tx pulse a number of Tx pulse, the number being the zone count, are delayed by a time equivalent to  Take our example above. When the range of the target reduces to -that is  greater than the 4 zones, the  delay is introduced into the Tx system. After 4 pulses the delay is transferred into the range gate generation system, and the target continues to be tracked. At that point the range is such that the zone counter will have been decremented by 1 and the apparent range will be , but with the target at a real range of 3 zones plus the apparent range.

References
AN/FPQ-6 Missile Range Instrumentation Set, USAF MIL-HDBK-162A, Volume 1, 15 December 1965. Radio Corporation of America, Moorestown, New Jersey.

See also
 AN/FPS-16

Ground radars
Military electronics of the United States